Marco Miesenböck (born 30 April 1989) is an Austrian footballer who plays for Kottingbrunn. He previously played in the First League for Austria Lustenau from July 2011 until November 2012 and for First Vienna from January 2013 until July 2014.
His youthclubs are situated in his home-city Klagenfurt: FC Kaernten/AKA Kaernten and FC Welzenegg (until July 2009). Then he changed to Lower Austria and played for "SV Horn" from July 2009 until July 2011.

References

1989 births
Living people
Association football forwards
Austrian footballers
SV Horn players
SC Austria Lustenau players
First Vienna FC players